Krishnakumar Kunnath (23 August 1968 – 31 May 2022), popularly known as KK, was an Indian playback singer. He recorded songs in Hindi, Tamil, Telugu, Kannada, Malayalam, Marathi, Odia, Bengali, Assamese and Gujarati. KK began his career by singing advertising jingles and made his film debut in 1996 on an A. R. Rahman soundtrack. 

He released his debut album, Pal in 1999. The songs "Pal" and "Yaaron" from the album became popular, and are used in school graduations. His popular songs included "Tadap Tadap Ke Is Dil Se" from Hum Dil De Chuke Sanam (1999), the Tamil song "Apadi Podu", "Dola Re Dola" from Devdas (2002), "Kya Mujhe Pyaar Hai" from Woh Lamhe... (2006), "Aankhon Mein Teri" from Om Shanti Om (2007), "Khuda Jane" from Bachna Ae Haseeno (2008), "Piya Aaye Na" from Aashiqui 2 (2013), "Mat Aazma Re" from Murder 3 (2013), "India Wale" from Happy New Year (2014), and "Tu Jo Mila" from Bajrangi Bhaijaan (2015).

He received the 2009 Best Playback Singer – Male Screen Award for "Khuda Jaane", from the film Bachna Ae Haseeno. KK received six Filmfare Awards nominations.

Early life 

Born in Delhi on 23 August 1968 to Malayali parents, Krishnakumar Kunnath grew up in New Delhi. He sang 3,500 jingles before breaking into Bollywood.

KK attended Delhi's Mount St Mary's School, and Kirori Mal College, Delhi University. He appeared in the song "Josh of India", released to support the Indian national team during the 1999 Cricket World Cup.

KK married Jyothy in 1991. His son, Nakul Krishna Kunnath, sang "Masti" (from his album, Humsafar) with him. KK also had a daughter.

Career 
After receiving a degree in commerce from Kirori Mal College, KK spent six months as a marketing executive before pursuing his love of music. He struggled to establish himself in the competitive recording industry, singing at hotels to make ends meet. KK moved to Mumbai in 1994.

Vocals and musical style 
He had no formal musical training.
According to film director Mahesh Bhatt, "KK had an emotional bandwidth which echoed all the seasons of the heart. He could be frivolous, romantic and anguished. He could go into the depths, talk about the wonder and magic of life."

KK believed that it was unimportant for a singer's face to be seen, but "a singer must be heard". In a 2019 interview, he said that he felt comfortable with a microphone but awkward in front of a camera. KK valued and "fiercely" protected his privacy. He did not want his singing to be associated with a particular actor and preferred singing for a number of actors.

Playback singing 
In 1994, KK gave a demo tape to Louis Banks, Ranjit Barot and Lesle Lewis. He was called by UTV, and sang a jingle for a Santogen Suiting ad. In a four-year period, KK sang over 3,500 jingles in 11 languages. He considered Lesle Lewis his mentor for giving him his first jingle to sing in Mumbai. KK then became a playback singer, beginning with A. R. Rahman's "Kalluri Saaley" and "Hello Dr." from Kadir's Kadhal Desam and "Strawberry Kannae" from AVM Productions's 1997 musical film, Minsara Kanavu.

Hindi
KK made his Bollywood debut with the song "Tadap Tadap Ke Is Dil Se" in Hum Dil De Chuke Sanam (1999). Before this song, however, he had sung parts of "Chhod Aaye Hum" in Gulzar's Maachis (1996). KK considered "Tadap Tadap Ke Is Dil Se" the turning point of his career. Other popular songs included "Dola Re Dola" in Devdas (2002), "Kya Mujhe Pyaar Hai" in Woh Lamhe... (2006), "Aankhon Mein Teri" in Om Shanti Om (2007), "Khuda Jane" in Bachna Ae Haseeno (2008), "Piya Aaye Na" in Aashiqui 2 (2013), "Mat Aazma Re" in Murder 3 (2013), "India Wale" in Happy New Year (2014) and "Tu Jo Mila" from Bajrangi Bhaijaan (2015).

KK received six Filmfare Awards nominations. He received the 2009 Screen Awards Best Playback Singer – Male award for "Khuda Jaane", from the film Bachna Ae Haseeno. In 2022, KK worked with filmmaker Srijit Mukherji and lyricist Gulzar on a song for Sherdil: The Pilibhit Saga. The song, "Dhoop Paani Bahne De", was the first song released since his death.

Tamil
KK sang popular songs in several languages, including Tamil. According to Outlook, his songs defined Tamil film music during the 2000s and became part of Tamil culture. In 2004, KK's Tamil song "Appadi Podu" became popular across India and was played at clubs and weddings. He worked with A. R. Rahman on "Strawberry Kanne", a popular song, in 1997.

He had a decade of hit songs during the 2000s. KK sang "Love Pannu" for Harris Jayaraj in 2001, followed by "Kadhal Oru Thani Katchi" and "Gundu Gundu Ponne". In 2003, he had two hits composed by Harris Jayaraj: "Uyirin Uyire" and "Kalyanam Dhaan Kattitkittu". "Uyirin Uyire" was popular in cities, and "Kalyanam Dhaan Kattitkittu" became popular across Tamil Nadu.

KK sang "Kadhal Valarthen", composed by Yuvan Shankar Raja. He worked with Harris Jayaraj and Yuvan Shankar Raja to produce two hit songs: "Kadhalikkum Aasai" and "Ninaithu Ninaithu". "Andankaaka Kondaikaari", composed by Harris Jayaraj, was another successful song. KK sang "Annanoda Paatu" in the film Chandramukhi. Other Tamil hit songs by were "Pani Thuli", "Olikuchi Udambukari", and "Lelakku Lelakku Lela". Despite his birth to a Malayali family in Thrissur, KK sang only one Malayalam song in his 25-year career: "Rahasyamay" in Puthiya Mukham (2009).

Albums 

In 1999, Sony Music had been launched in India and wanted to introduce a new artiste. KK was selected, and released his debut solo album: Pal, with music by Lesle Lewis of the duo Colonial Cousins (who also arranged and produced the album). Pal was a pop rock album. and the songs "Aap Ki Dua", "Yaaron" and the title track, "Pal" were popular with audiences and on the music charts; "Pal" and "Yaaron" are frequently played at school farewells. KK received the 1999 Screen Award for Best SingerMale (non-film music) for the album.

He released his next album, Humsafar, on 22 January 2008. Humsafar featured "Aasman Ke", "Dekho Na", "Yeh Kahan Mil Gaye Hum", "Rain Bhai Kaari (Maajhi)", and the English-language ballad "Cineraria". The lyrics of its title track are a mixture of English and Hindi, and eight songs on the album were composed by KK.

Television 
He sang many songs for television serials, including Just Mohabbat, Shaka Laka Boom Boom, Kuch Jhuki Si Palkein, Hip Hip Hurray, Kkavyanjali and Just Dance. KK was a jury member on the talent-hunt show, Fame Gurukul.

He sang "Tanha Chala" on the Pakistani TV show The Ghost, which aired on Hum TV in 2008. The song was composed by Farrukh Abid and Shoiab Farrukh, with lyrics by Momina Duraid.

KK appeared on the MTV India musical programme Coke Studio, singing the qawwali "Chadta Suraj" with the Sabri Brothers and a reprise of "Tu Aashiqui Hai" from Jhankaar Beats. He appeared on Surili Baat, on the Aaj Tak channel. KK performed on Sony Mix and MTV Unplugged, which aired on MTV on 11 January 2014. He presented his Salaam Dubai 2014 concert in Dubai in April 2014, and performed in concert in Goa, Dubai, Chennai and Hong Kong.

On 29 August 2015, KK appeared in season two of the television singing-reality show Indian Idol Junior as a judge and guest jury member. On 13 September of that year, he appeared on the Sony Mix show Baaton Baaton Mein. In a 2019 Hindustan Times interview, KK said that he was active in the music industry with live performances and playback singing. Live performances made him happy; he did not want to abandon his "commitment to the audience", and wanted to release a new album after the 2008 success of his second album.

Death 
On 31 May 2022, KK performed a concert at a college festival at Nazrul Mancha in South Kolkata. After the concert, he returned to his hotel in Esplanade. KK complained of feeling unwell on the way back to his hotel, where he experienced cardiac arrest. He collapsed, and efforts to revive him at the hotel were unsuccessful. KK was rushed to Calcutta Medical Research Institute (CMRI) at about 10:30 pm, where he was declared dead. He was 53 years old.

On 1 June 2022, Kolkata Police registered a case of unnatural death to investigate KK's death. His autopsy was videographed; the report cited myocardial infarction (heart attack) as the probable cause of death, ruling out foul play. According to the doctor who conducted the autopsy, KK could have survived if he had received cardiopulmonary resuscitation (CPR) immediately after losing consciousness. He had complained to his wife about pain in his shoulder and arm for several days before his death, thinking it was caused by digestive problems. According to the autopsy report, KK's heart had an 80-percent blockage. Three public interest litigations (PILs) related to the singer's death were registered in the Calcutta High Court.

Funeral and tributes
KK was given a gun salute by the West Bengal government at Rabindra Sadan in Kolkata. West Bengal chief minister Mamata Banerjee was present for the salute; film- and music-industry figures and politicians, including Prime Minister Narendra Modi, offered their condolences. KK's remains were brought to Mumbai, and his funeral was held at the Versova Hindu Cemetery on the following day (2 June). It was attended by family members, friends and colleagues.

Reporting KK's death, Deccan Herald called him the "voice of love". According to The Times of India, he was Bollywood's most versatile singer. An article in The Hindu said, "Till the end, he remained a rage in the concert circuit and will be remembered as the singer who became the voice of the heart".

Discography

Awards and honors 
In a Hindustan Times interview, KK was asked if he was bothered by being nominated for a number of awards but seldom winning. He said no: "As a singer, I haven't felt any lesser by not getting an award. Winning or not winning an award doesn't affect me. I just like to do my work in the best possible manner. I am happy getting good songs. I am happy not getting awards."

References

External links 

 
 
 

1968 births
2022 deaths
Bollywood playback singers
Delhi University alumni
Indian Hindus
Indian male playback singers
Indian male singer-songwriters
Indian singer-songwriters
Kannada playback singers
Kirori Mal College alumni
Malayalam playback singers
People from New Delhi
Screen Awards winners
Singers from Delhi
Tamil playback singers
Telugu playback singers